A Center Weather Service Unit (CWSU) is a National Weather Service (NWS) unit located inside each of the Federal Aviation Administration's 22 Air Route Traffic Control Centers (ARTCC).

Overview 

CWSU meteorologists provide support for FAA's air traffic management with pertinent meteorological information for airports and airspace in the control center's area of responsibility.

Meteorologists disseminate information to brief air traffic control area managers where, when, and what is expected, when the weather arrives in the ARTCC's various sectors.  Dissemination is by computer products, by incoming phone requests, and by stand up briefings.  Occasionally CWSUs provide weather information and recommendations directly to air traffic controllers.  They sometimes will provide information directly to the pilots of aircraft in distress due to hazardous weather conditions.  In addition to SIGMETs (significant meteorological events), Convective SIGMETs (significant meteorological event associated with convection), and AIRMETs (significant meteorological events generally effecting smaller aircraft) issued by the Aviation Weather Center (AWC), CWSUs issue Center Weather Advisories (CWA) and Meteorological Impact Statements (MIS) as necessary.

CWSUs are staffed by around 4 NWS meteorologists (including one manager), but their operations are eventually reimbursed by the FAA's budget under an "Interagency Agreement".  Due to budget pressures, the FAA was considering closing the CWSU program up to 2006.

See also 
 Spaceflight Meteorology Group (SMG)

References

External links 
 CWSU products
 Aviation Weather Center (AWC)
 CWSUs

National Weather Service
Federal Aviation Administration